Route 27 is a  south–north state highway in eastern Massachusetts. Its southern terminus is at Route 106 in Kingston and its northern terminus is at Route 4 in Chelmsford. Along the way it intersects several major highways including Route 24 in Brockton, U.S. Route 1 (US 1) in Walpole, Route 9 in Natick, US 20 in Wayland, and Route 2 in Acton.

Route description

Route 27 runs in a sweeping arc from Kingston to Chelmsford.  For most of its route, it acts as an intermediate route between Interstate 95 and Interstate 495.

Route 27 begins in Kingston at Route 106, approximately 1-1/4 miles west of Route 3.  It heads northwest towards Brockton, passing through Pembroke, Hanson, East Bridgewater and Whitman.  In Brockton the road shares a triple concurrency with Route 28 and Route 123 Eastbound (Route 123 Westbound only intersects with the route).  From the center of town, Route 27 heads northwest, past the Westgate Mall, over Route 24 at Exits 33A-B (formerly 18A-B), and past Good Samaritan Hospital before passing into Norfolk County via Stoughton.

In Stoughton, the road has a brief concurrency with Route 138 in the center of town.  It passes just south of the town of Canton before making a large loop through the town of Sharon.  It crosses over Interstate 95 without access, between Exits 19 and 21 (formerly 9 and 10 respectively), both of which are accessible via US Route 1 nearby.  It then crosses through Walpole and Medfield before crossing the Charles River into Middlesex County and the town of Sherborn.

In Sherborn, the road begins a more northerly direction, with a short concurrency with Route 16 in the center of town.  The road heads through the center of Natick, passing the town green and crossing Route 135, which carries the Boston Marathon at that point.  Route 27 crosses over Route 9 with a four-way exit ramp system, just east of Lake Cochituate, the Natick Mall and the Golden Triangle retail area.  Route 27 passes into Wayland and under the Massachusetts Turnpike, which it accesses via Route 30, just north of the Pike.

In Wayland, Route 27 has a 1.2-mile concurrency with Route 126, passing through the center of town and intersecting US Route 20. The road then crosses the Sudbury River into Sudbury and through the historic town center.  It passes into Maynard, having a short, 0.1-mile concurrency with Route 62 over the Assabet River, before heading north into Acton.  It crosses Route 2 at Exit 117 (formerly 42) before crossing through the town center, past the Isaac Davis Monument.  It sweeps by Carlisle before directly crossing into Westford, passing through the southeast corner of town before heading into Chelmsford.  Route 27 ends at the center of town, at the intersection of Routes 4, 110 and 129, just south of Interstate 495 and U.S. Route 3.

History 
Route 27's original form was identical to the modern route south of Wayland, with the exception of a bypass built in 1963 from the Charles River at the Sherborn-Medfield line to Route 109 in Medfield center.

North of Wayland the route followed current Route 126 into Concord.  It came into its current form by 1939. However, historical maps from the U.S. Department of the Interior from 1943 show Route 27 running concurrent with US 20 from Wayland Center to Concord Road in Sudbury, then following Concord Road to Sudbury Center, where it resumed its current alignment on Hudson Road.

Major intersections

References

027
Kingston, Massachusetts
Pembroke, Massachusetts
Hanson, Massachusetts
East Bridgewater, Massachusetts
Whitman, Massachusetts
Brockton, Massachusetts
Stoughton, Massachusetts
Sharon, Massachusetts
Walpole, Massachusetts
Medfield, Massachusetts
Sherborn, Massachusetts
Natick, Massachusetts
Wayland, Massachusetts
Sudbury, Massachusetts
Maynard, Massachusetts
Acton, Massachusetts
Carlisle, Massachusetts
Westford, Massachusetts
Chelmsford, Massachusetts
Transportation in Plymouth County, Massachusetts
Transportation in Norfolk County, Massachusetts
Transportation in Middlesex County, Massachusetts